Downe House is a Grade II listed house on Richmond Hill, in the London Borough of Richmond upon Thames, which has been occupied by playwright Richard Brinsley Sheridan, The Rolling Stones' lead vocalist Mick Jagger and model Jerry Hall.

Description
The Georgian house dates from  1780, is on part of Richmond Hill and overlooks the Thames; the apex of the Thames side of the hill marks the start of Richmond Park which itself forms the plateau at the top of the hill, the largest urban park in the United Kingdom. The home was built of brown brick with yellow window dressing. It includes four storeys and a basement with bays on either side and balconies above. It features modillion cornice and balustrading above and cast-iron balustrades on the second floor windows. Windows above the bays are round-headed, and others are square-headed sash windows. The porch has heavy entablature and Doric piers.

History
Part of the Royal Manor of Richmond since Domesday, Richmond Park was enclosed (fully privatised) by King Charles I around 1635 as a post-medieval deer park. The manor was mostly agricultural land in the early 18th century, but Terrace Walk was laid out at the top of Richmond Hill in the later 18th century, followed by construction of further grand houses, including Downe House. The house is thought to have been built around 1780, and at one time was owned by Richard Brinsley Sheridan.

Mick Jagger bought the house in the early 1990s where he lived with his longtime partner, model Jerry Hall. After the two separated, Jerry Hall remained in Downe House while Jagger moved into a flat next door. It is listed as Grade II by Historic England.

References

External links
Image of Downe House from Everystock Photo

1780s establishments in England
Grade II listed buildings in the London Borough of Richmond upon Thames
History of the London Borough of Richmond upon Thames
Houses in the London Borough of Richmond upon Thames
Richmond, London